Brian Whelan (born 1939), is a male former boxer who competed for England. He is not to be confused with the professional fighter Brian Whelan from Luton.

Boxing career
He represented England and won a bronze medal in the 60 kg lightweight at the 1962 British Empire and Commonwealth Games in Perth, Western Australia.

He was a member of the Chiswick General Amateur Boxing Club and was 1962 ABA champion after famously beating the great amateur Dick McTaggart. He was only one of two fighters who won for England in the 8-2 defeat by Russia in the 1962 international meeting.

Personal life
He was a milkman by trade.

References

1939 births
English male boxers
Commonwealth Games medallists in boxing
Commonwealth Games bronze medallists for England
Boxers at the 1962 British Empire and Commonwealth Games
Living people
Lightweight boxers
Medallists at the 1962 British Empire and Commonwealth Games